Akparavuni is a community in Biase local government area of Cross River State, Nigeria.

References 

Villages in Cross River State